Hilltop is a historic building on the Mary Baldwin University campus in Staunton, Virginia. The original section was built about 1810, with a large brick wing added in 1904.  It is a two-story, five bay, stuccoed brick building.  It features a huge two-story hexastyle portico with massive Tuscan order columns.  Originally built as a private dwelling, it was converted to dormitory use.   In 1991, it was completely restored thanks to the patronage of heiresses Margaret Hunt Hill and Caroline Rose Hunt.

It was listed on the National Register of Historic Places (NRHP) in 1979.

See also
Other NRHP-listed buildings on campus are the Mary Baldwin University, Main Building, C. W. Miller House, and Rose Terrace.

References

 

University and college buildings on the National Register of Historic Places in Virginia
National Register of Historic Places in Staunton, Virginia
Houses completed in 1810
Mary Baldwin University
Buildings and structures in Staunton, Virginia